The 2022 UEFA European Women's Football Championship, commonly referred to as UEFA Women's Euro 2022 or simply Euro 2022, was the 13th edition of the UEFA Women's Championship, the quadrennial international football championship organised by UEFA for the women's national teams of Europe. It was the second edition since it was expanded to 16 teams. The tournament was hosted by England, and was originally scheduled to take place from 7 July to 1 August 2021. However, the COVID-19 pandemic in Europe in early 2020 resulted in subsequent postponements of the 2020 Summer Olympics and UEFA Euro 2020 to summer 2021, so the tournament was rescheduled for 6 to 31 July 2022. England last hosted the tournament in 2005, which had been the final tournament to feature just eight teams.

Defending champions Netherlands, who won UEFA Women's Euro 2017 as hosts, were eliminated in the quarter-finals by France. Hosts England won their first UEFA Women's Championship title by beating Germany 2–1 after extra time in the final, held at Wembley Stadium in London. As winners, they will compete in the inaugural 2023 Women's Finalissima against Brazil, winners of the 2022 Copa América Femenina.

The video assistant referee (VAR), as well as goal-line technology, were used in the final tournament.

Host selection
England were the only country to submit a bid before the deadline. Hungary and Austria had previously announced interest in submitting bids to host. England were confirmed as hosts at the UEFA Executive Committee meeting in Dublin, Republic of Ireland, on 3 December 2018. They had previously hosted the Women's Euro in 2005, described as a watershed in terms of developing the sport, with stadium and television audiences having exceeded expectations.

A January 2022 study debated the benefits of England hosting Euro 2022 in terms of sports tourism – though mainly for the men's game, England was already a global hub for football – or for the improvements major sporting events can bring to a host, as no new stadiums or infrastructure would be required in the nation; it suggested that the hosts "intended to leverage further the development of the women's game in England and enhance the country's image as one of the main hubs of women's football."

Qualification
A total of 48 UEFA nations entered the competition (including Cyprus which entered for the first time at senior women's level, and Kosovo which entered their first Women's Euro), and with the hosts England qualifying automatically, the other 47 teams competed in the qualifying competition to determine the remaining 15 spots in the final tournament. In a change from previous qualifying competitions, the preliminary round had been abolished and all entrants started from the qualifying group stage. The qualifying competition consists of two rounds:
Qualifying group stage: The 47 teams were drawn into nine groups: two groups of six teams and seven groups of five teams. Each group was played in home-and-away round-robin format. The nine group winners and the three best runners-up (not counting results against the sixth-placed team) qualified directly for the final tournament, while the remaining six runners-up advanced to the play-offs.
Play-offs: The six teams were drawn into three ties to play home-and-away two-legged matches to determine the last three qualified teams.

The draw for the qualifying group stage was held on 21 February 2019 in Nyon. The qualifying group stage took place from August 2019 to December 2020, while the play-offs took place in April 2021, previously scheduled for October 2020.

Qualified teams
In February 2022, the Russian team was suspended following their country's invasion of Ukraine. UEFA later announced on 2 May 2022 that Russian teams were banned from every European competition, disqualifying Russia from the Women's Euro 2022. Portugal, whom Russia defeated in the play-offs, would take part instead.

14 of the 16 qualified teams had also taken part in the 2017 edition. Northern Ireland was the only team to make its debut at the 2022 finals. Finland meanwhile returned after missing the previous tournament. Scotland was the only team present in 2017 that failed to qualify for these finals apart from the banned Russia.

The following teams qualified for the final tournament.

Notes

Final draw
The final draw took place in Manchester, England, on 28 October 2021 at 18:00 CEST.

It was originally set on 6 November 2020, but had been postponed due to the COVID-19 pandemic.
The 16 teams were drawn into four groups of four teams. The hosts were assigned to position A1 in the draw while the other teams were seeded according to their coefficient ranking following the end of the qualifying stage, calculated based on the following:
UEFA Women's Euro 2017 final tournament and qualifying competition (20%)
2019 FIFA Women's World Cup final tournament and qualifying competition (40%)
UEFA Women's Euro 2022 qualifying competition (group stage only, excluding play-offs) (40%)

Notes

Venues
Meadow Lane in Nottingham and London Road in Peterborough were initially included on the list of stadiums when the Football Association submitted the bid to host the tournament. These were changed with the City Ground in Nottingham and St Mary's in Southampton due to UEFA requirements. The City Ground was replaced by  Leigh Sports Village when the final list of venues was confirmed in August 2019. On 23 February 2020, Old Trafford in Trafford (Greater Manchester) was confirmed as the venue of the opening match featuring England,  with Wembley Stadium to host the final. For Euro 2022, UEFA announced 10 venues.

The announcement of hosting plans in 2019 drew criticism from The Guardian, which noted that the bid had emphasised the use of Wembley Stadium, while the plan was only to use it for the final. It and others also criticised that though the tournament would use stadiums in different parts of the country, none were in the North East. This geographical concern was also a main subject of negative reactions on social media. A 2019 study noted that women's football had developed greatly following the 2005 Euro in the North West region in which it had been held, with a 2020 study noting that the North East was a prominent location for women's football. A lack of stadiums chosen in the Midlands also saw criticism closer to the tournament.

Stadium size was also criticised, with major complaints coming from Iceland's Sara Björk Gunnarsdóttir; the 7,000 capacity Academy Stadium being the main focus, which would be limited to 4,700 capacity for the tournament due to UEFA restrictions preventing the use of standing capacity. The decision to include the stadium was labelled "embarrassing" and "disrespectful", and did not reflect the growth of women's football. The Leigh Sports Village would also be restricted to 8,100 instead of its typical 12,000 capacity due to the same restrictions.

Match officials
On 19 April 2022, UEFA announced the selected match officials for the tournament. On 27 April, Belgian official Ella De Vries was added as an assistant VAR.

Referees

  Ivana Martinčić
  Jana Adámková
  Rebecca Welch
  Lina Lehtovaara
  Stéphanie Frappart
  Riem Hussein
  Iuliana Demetrescu
  Marta Huerta de Aza
  Tess Olofsson
  Esther Staubli
  Kateryna Monzul
  Emikar Calderas Barrera
  Cheryl Foster

Assistant referees

  Sara Telek
  Mary Blanco Bolívar
  Sanja Rođak-Karšić
  Polyxeni Irodotou
  Lucie Ratajová
  Sian Massey-Ellis
  Lisa Rashid
  Karolin Kaivoja
  Élodie Coppola
  Manuela Nicolosi
  Katrin Rafalski
  Chrysoula Kourompylia
  Anita Vad
  Francesca Di Monte
  Franca Overtoom
  Paulina Baranowska
  Michelle O'Neill
  Petruța Iugulescu
  Mária Súkeníková
  Staša Špur
  Guadalupe Porras Ayuso
  Almira Spahić
  Susanne Küng
  Maryna Striletska
  Migdalia Rodríguez Chirino

VARs

  Ella De Vries
  Chris Kavanagh
  Benoît Millot
  Maïka Vanderstichel
  Christian Dingert
  Harm Osmers
  Maurizio Mariani
  Paolo Valeri
  Pol van Boekel
  Dennis Higler
  Bartosz Frankowski
  Tomasz Kwiatkowski
  Luís Godinho
  Tiago Martins
  Guillermo Cuadra Fernández
  José María Sánchez Martínez

Support officials

  Ivana Projkovska
  Lorraine Watson

Squads

Each national team had to submit a squad of 23 players, three of whom must be goalkeepers. If a player was injured or ill severely enough to prevent her participation in the tournament before her team's first match, she could be replaced by another player.

Group stage

The provisional match schedule was confirmed by the UEFA Executive Committee during their meeting in Nyon, Switzerland on 4 December 2019.

The final match schedule was confirmed by the UEFA on 2 May 2022.

The group winners and runners-up advanced to the quarter-finals.

Tiebreakers
In the group stage, teams were ranked according to points (3 points for a win, 1 point for a draw, 0 points for a loss), and if tied on points, the following tiebreaking criteria were applied, in the order given, to determine the rankings (Regulations Articles 18.01 and 18.02):
Points in head-to-head matches among tied teams;
Goal difference in head-to-head matches among tied teams;
Goals scored in head-to-head matches among tied teams;
If more than two teams are tied, and after applying all head-to-head criteria above, a subset of teams are still tied, all head-to-head criteria above are reapplied exclusively to this subset of teams;
Goal difference in all group matches;
Goals scored in all group matches;
Penalty shoot-out if only two teams have the same number of points, and they met in the last round of the group and are tied after applying all criteria above (not used if more than two teams have the same number of points, or if their rankings are not relevant for qualification for the next stage);
Lower disciplinary points (red card = 3 points, yellow card = 1 point, expulsion for two yellow cards in one match = 3 points);
UEFA coefficient ranking for the final draw.

All times are local, BST (UTC+1).

Group A

Group B

Group C

Group D

Knockout stage

In the knockout stage, extra time and a penalty shoot-out were used to decide the winner if necessary.

Bracket

Quarter-finals

Semi-finals

Final

Statistics

Goalscorers

Awards 

UEFA Team of the Tournament

UEFA's technical observer team was given the objective of naming a team of the best eleven players from the tournament. Four players from the winning England squad were named in the team as well as five from runners-up Germany.

Player of the Tournament

The Player of the Tournament award was given to Beth Mead, who was chosen by UEFA's technical observers.
 Beth Mead

Young Player of the Tournament

The Young Player of the Tournament award was open to players born on or after 1 January 1999. The inaugural award was given to Lena Oberdorf, as chosen by UEFA's technical observers.
 Lena Oberdorf

Top Scorer

The top scorer award, sponsored by Grifols, was given to the top scorer in the tournament. Beth Mead won the award with six goals scored in the tournament. Though she finished level with Alexandra Popp on goals, Mead had more assists in the tournament. The ranking was determined using the following criteria: 1) goals, 2) assists, 3) fewest minutes played, 4) goals in qualifying.

Goal of the Tournament

The Goal of the Tournament was decided by UEFA's Technical Observer panel. On 5 August 2022, UEFA announced that England forward Alessia Russo's goal against Sweden had been named the goal of the tournament. 

  Alessia Russo (vs Sweden)

The Technical Observer panel ranked a list of the top ten goals of the tournament, five of which were scored by England. Two goals each from Russo and Germany's Alexandra Popp were included:

Russo's goal against Sweden was also voted the Goal of the Tournament by fans on 5 August 2022; the top ten list was put to a fan vote, which produced a fan-voted top three. While the top goal selected by the Technical Observer panel was also voted the top goal by fans, the goals ranked tenth and ninth were voted as second and third by fans:

Final ranking

Prize money 
In September 2021, UEFA announced that the prize money for the UEFA Women's Euro 2022 championship will be €16 million, double the amount of the UEFA Women's Euro 2017 prize money.

The prize money distribution for the teams is:
 Qualification to the final series: €600,000
 Win a match in group stage: €100,000
 Draw a match in group stage: €50,000
 Reaching the quarter-final: €205,000
 Reaching the semi-final: €320,000
 Runner-up: €420,000
 Champions: €660,000

The prize money is cumulative; because champions England also won all three of their group matches, they received a total of €2,085,000.

Marketing

Music 
Music artist Joy Crookes was heavily involved in Euro 2022: she devised the story and took part in the announcement video for the England squad, and her song "Feet Don't Fail Me Now" was used as the title sequence music for the tournament, accompanied by a video featuring Crookes and various players. "Feet Don't Fail Me Now" is also on the soundtrack of the videogame FIFA 22, and has been used as the title music for the Women's Super League (WSL).

Sponsors 
The tournament involved campaigns with several of UEFA's sponsorship partners. Hisense launched a countdown campaign that focused on individual women's players to generate recognition, and during the tournament used social media to engage fans with clips from matches. Volkswagen created a campaign titled "Not Women's Football", to promote equality in the women's game. It also built on the popularity of its Tiny Football Car from (the men's) Euro 2020 with Tiny Buzz, a small remote-controlled model of the 2022 electric minivan. Tiny Buzz was painted in pride rainbow colours, something that Tiny Football Car was for the 2020 final and which proved popular, also showing the commitment to embracing the LGBT+ community in football. A social media account for Tiny Buzz was used throughout the tournament, giving the car a characteristic tone of voice to engage fans.

Broadcasting
UEFA partnered with over 60 broadcasters, with the tournament able to be watched on UEFA's website in nations with no broadcast deal. Over 50 of the broadcasters had on-site productions, more than double that of the last edition of the Women's Euro. The tournament was watched live by over 365 million people in 195 territories.

Europe

Outside Europe

* Only available in countries without broadcasting deals.

Legacy 
Effects of Euro 2022 seen before it was hosted include the creation of Manchester United W.F.C. and the investment of the BBC to begin broadcasting WSL games following the tournament. The tournament was also used as an opportunity to highlight women's football. The National Football Museum held the first part of an exhibit on women's football history over the course of Euro 2022, among other endeavours to amplify women's voices in football, including collaborating with the Football Association on a heritage project, interviewing women including former Lionesses. England invested £3.1million into related social impact programmes across the country, including the Euro 2022 roadshow, which travelled to ten cities and attracted over 35,000 visitors to learn about the history of women's football.

Upon both nations in the final having been decided, online betting had seen a record number of bets for women's football, with Bloomberg News writing that no matter which team took the title, women's football would be the winner. Behind the UK and Germany, the third-most online bets for the tournament were recorded in Brazil. The tournament achieved an estimated live viewership of around 365 million globally via all channels and fan engagement on social media saw related hashtags on Twitter and TikTok reach over a billion views each, marking successful growth in international popularity of and interactive elements of women's football.

Following the tournament, it was reported that a record 29,000 girls are set to compete in the National Cup in 2022–23. Media rights for women's football had increased by 289% compared to the previous Women's Euro.

England and UEFA rolled out a legacy programme ahead of the tournament, to run through 2024, in the host cities. By August 2022, a month after the conclusion of the tournament, the number of new participants in girls' and women's football was in the tens of thousands. In October 2022, UEFA reported that spectators of Euro 2022 were overwhelmingly likely to watch more women's football in future, and that the tournament had equally-significantly improved perceptions of women's football. Nearly three-quarters of residents in host cities felt that Euro 2022 had brought their communities closer, and millions of pounds sterling boosted local economies. Hundreds of thousands of opportunities in grassroots football in England were created, with some people saying that watching Euro 2022 encouraged them to be more active.

See also
UEFA Euro 1996
UEFA Women's Euro 2005

References

External links

Official Technical Report
Women's Euro Matches: 2022, UEFA.com

 
2022
Women's Euro 2022
2022–23 in English women's football
2022 in women's association football
International women's association football competitions hosted by England
July 2022 sports events in the United Kingdom
Association football events postponed due to the COVID-19 pandemic
Sports events affected by the 2022 Russian invasion of Ukraine